Zhan Qimin (born 22 January 1959) is a Chinese molecular oncologist currently serving as director of Peking University Medicine Department, executive vice-president of Peking University and dean of Peking University Shenzhen Graduate School. He is a member of the Communist Party of China.

Biography
Zhan was born in January 22, 1959 in Leping, Jiangxi, while his ancestral home in Wuyuan County. He graduated from the Medical College of Suzhou University in November 1982 and Peking Union Medical College in August 1987, respectively. He carried out postdoctoral research at the Medical School of the University of California, San Francisco, the University of Texas Southwestern Medical Center and the National Cancer Institute. After university, he became a senior research assistant at the National Cancer Institute. In September 1998 he was assistant professor at the University of Pittsburgh School of Medicine, and held that position until February 2003.

Zhan returned to China in January 2002 and that same year became professor and doctoral supervisor at Peking Union Medical College and director of the State Key Laboratory of Molecular Oncology, Chinese Academy of Medical Sciences. In May 2005, he was promoted to become vice-president of the Chinese Academy of Medical Sciences and vice-president of Peking Union Medical College. In April 2016, he was transferred to Peking University and appointed director of the Department of Medicine. In August 2017, he was elevated to its vice-president and then executive vice-president in April of the following year. He concurrently serves as dean of Peking University Shenzhen Graduate School since March 2019.

Investigation
In July 2020, PubPeer had published 25 papers of Zhan Qimin, which are suspected of academic fraud. These papers had been exposed in succession, involving the application of the same pictures in different experiments or even different articles, fabricating experimental data and seriously violating animal ethics. The 25 papers were published from 1998 to 2019.

Honours and awards
 2011 Member of the Chinese Academy of Engineering (CAE)

References

1959 births
Living people
Engineers from Jiangxi
Peking Union Medical College alumni
Members of the Chinese Academy of Engineering